The Dreadnaught Factor is a scrolling shooter written by Tom Loughry for the Mattel Intellivision and published by Activision in 1983. It is one of several Intellivision games developed at Cheshire Engineering for Activision. Atari 8-bit family and Atari 5200 ports followed in 1984.

Gameplay
The player flies a small fighter spacecraft to attack a very large and heavily armed vessel, a dreadnaught.  Each dreadnaught approaches the "Galactic Unstable Energy Field," which acts as a defensive line.  The goal is to disable or destroy each dreadnaught before it can reach the Energy Field and launch its missiles on the planets the player is entrusted with defending.

As the game progresses, the player can make repeated passes over the dreadnaught, one fighter at a time, attempting to weaken its defenses, slow its progress, and finally destroy it.  The fighter is equipped with lasers and bombs to attack different targets.  Bombing the dreadnaught's engines slows its progress and shooting out its bridges reduces the dreadnaught's ability to return fire from any intact gun turrets. In order to destroy the dreadnaught, the player has to bomb all of its energy vents, causing the vessel to overheat and explode. As soon as a dreadnaught is destroyed, another one of a different design arrives. There are five types of dreadnaughts, each of which poses its own challenges.

The game has difficulty levels from "Basic" and "Novice" to "Expert" and finally, "You've Got to Be Kidding." The dreadnaughts' speed, rate of fire, and fleet size are increased at higher difficulty levels.

Reception
A December 1983 review in Joystik magazine awarded the game four stars and called it "a sure winner."

References

Activision games
Atari 5200 games
Atari 8-bit family games
1983 video games
Intellivision games
Vertically scrolling shooters
Video games developed in the United States